

Uganda at the 1994 Commonwealth Games was abbreviated UGA.

Medals

Gold
none

Silver
Fred Mutuweta — Boxing, Men's Bantamweight
Charles Kizza — Boxing, Men's Heavyweight

Bronze
none

1994

C
Nations at the 1994 Commonwealth Games